High Coal or Highcoal is an unincorporated community and coal town located in Boone County, West Virginia, United States.

References 

Coal towns in West Virginia
Unincorporated communities in West Virginia
Unincorporated communities in Boone County, West Virginia
Former populated places in West Virginia